The Province of Teramo is a province in the Abruzzo region of Italy. Its capital is the city of Teramo. The Province of Teramo shares its northern border with the Province of Ascoli Piceno in the Marche Region, southern and southwestern borders with the Province of L'Aquila in the Abruzzo Region, and a western border with the Province of Rieti in the Region of Lazio. To the south is the Abruzzo Province of Pescara and to the east is the Adriatic Sea.

Geography

The landscape of the Province of Teramo  is dominated almost entirely on the east by a large body of water with the beaches of the Adriatic sea and by the Apennine Mountains which his highest peak of Gran Sasso d'Italia westside. The province is indeed divided latitudinally by the characteristic hills and valleys rich in vineyards and olive groves that begin in the Apennines and run almost to the coast. Colline Teramane (Teramo Hills) has become a trademark and are one of the most significant areas where extra virgin olive oil and Abruzzo wines are produced. Unique of the province of Teramo is the short distance between the beaches of the Adriatic sea and the  snowcapped Gran Sasso peaks. They can be reached within an hour from one point to the other.
The peaks of the Gran Sasso rise to the west of the Province of Teramo while those of the Monti della Laga dominate its northern border. These two ridges are among the most distinctive and the most relevant of the entire Apennine Mountain range. A good part of Gran Sasso and Monti della Laga National Park is nestled in the province. Calderone, the southernmost glacier in Continental European, is found nearby. In contrast to the rugged and isolated Gran Sasso area, the Monti della Laga are characterised by thick forests, shallow gorges, rolling slopes and valleys, and several spectacular waterfalls.
In addition to the provincial capital, the most populous and important commercial centers include Roseto degli Abruzzi  and Giulianova with populations of 25,000 and 24,000 inhabitants respectively.  On the eastern portion of the province are the so-called "seven sister" beaches directly adjacent to the Adriatic Sea. These resorts are noted for one of the highest blue flag beaches density, very fine white sand and their mild and wholesome Mediterranean climates which support a rich flora of palm, pine and oleander trees. Much of the province is hilly and very few large flat plains are to be found. Running from the west to the east are a number of valley streams and rivers which eventually empty into the Adriatic Sea.
The province of Teramo can easily be reached by car or bus from Rome via the A24 highway and it is also connected to the A14 highway.

Culture
Towns in the Province of Teramo include Civitella del Tronto and  Atri. The first stood as the northernmost protective point of the Kingdom of the Two Sicilies. In Atri there is a Roman Catholic cathedral and a theatre. The provincial capital of Teramo hosts a large cathedral and has for centuries served all of Abruzzo as a main administrative and economic center.

On 15 September 2005 the President of Italy, Carlo Azeglio Ciampi, went to Teramo to make a special presentation in honour of the resistance movement that arose in this town against the Nazi forces during the Second World War. A special note was made of the young Italian partisans who gathered in the village of Bosco Martese. There they risked deportation, severe reprisals, and other barbarous acts.

Tourism

Main tourist attractions include:
Atri, including an erosion phenomenon called "Bolge" and see the treasures of the Count of Aquaviva.
Campli - a characteristic village once possession of the Farnese Family. Its St Paul Church holds a Scala Sancta.
Castelli is a village 25 miles away (40 km) from Teramo. It is known for its maiolicas. In the past local artisans produced ceramics for most of the royal houses of Europe.
Civitella del Tronto - Bourbon fortress which is the most visited monument of the Abruzzo region, surrounding village e and gole del Salinello. The place holds a significative importance in the history of Italy unification.
Colline Teramane (Teramo hills) are a very distinctive and significant area where extra virgin olive oil and Abruzzo wines are produced.
Giulianova - an example of renaissance ideal city on the Adriatic Sea founded by Giulio Antonio Acquaviva.
Montagne Gemelle (Twin Mountains) of the Gran Sasso and Monti della Laga National Park are two suggestive mountains standing alongside. They are often taken as one of the symbols of the province of Teramo.
Montorio al Vomano - historical medieval town and its cathedral.
Teramo - cathedral and museums.
Gran Sasso and Monti della Laga National Park.
The Shrine of Gabriel of Our Lady of Sorrows with average of 2 million visitors per year is one of the 15 most visited sanctuaries in the world.

From north to south, the province of Teramo boasts several blue flag beaches on the Adriatric Seacoast, called the seven sisters, are the following:
Martinsicuro
Alba Adriatica
Tortoreto
Giulianova
Roseto degli Abruzzi
Pineto
Silvi Marina

Transportation

Major highways
The Province of Teramo can be reached from the north and the south by the main highway, the A14, that runs along the Adriatic Coast.  It can be reached from the west by the A24 coming from Rome via L'Aquila.

Railroad lines
The central railroad station of the province is located in Giulianova. From here is it possible to follow the coastline to the north and south or to travel in a westerly direction towards the provincial capital.

Seaports
The port of Giulianova is the maritime terminal of the Province of Teramo.

Administration
Since 2009, the president of the province has been Valter Catarra of the centre-right political party.

Major comuni
The main comuni and towns by population as of 2005 are:

Teramo (52,794), Roseto degli Abruzzi (23,669), Giulianova (21,875), Silvi Marina (15,247), Martinsicuro (15,047), Pineto (13,763), Atri (11,269), Alba Adriatica (11,219), Sant'Egidio alla Vibrata (9,177), Mosciano Sant'Angelo (8,559), Tortoreto (8,536), Montorio al Vomano (8,072), Campli (7,598), Bellante (7,208).

Frazione

Gallery

References

External links 
Province of Teramo Homepage (in Italian)
Abruzzo 2000 - Province of Teramo Information
Gran Sasso National Park

 
Teramo